Alsvågvatnet is a lake which lies in Øksnes Municipality in Nordland county, Norway. It is on the island of Langøya in the Vesterålen archipelago. There is birch woodland and bogland nearby.

References

Øksnes
Lakes of Nordland
Vesterålen